Priyanka Chhabra is an Indian actress and model.

She started her acting career by playing Princess Chaula in Zee TV's television series Shobha Somnath Ki. The show wrapped up and she was immediately approached to play the female lead opposite renowned comedian Vennela Kishore in his first ever movie as a Hero. She made her film debut with Vennela Kishore as the female lead in the 2013 Telugu Romantic-comedy film Athadu Aame O Scooter. She also appeared as a female lead in MTV's Webbed series opposite Abhishek Malik. She was the female protagonist in the  Valentines Day special of Fireworks Productions's SuperCops vs Supervillains in Life OK. And then appeared in 3 different stories of Fireworks Productions longest running show, Aahat as the Female Lead on Sony TV.

Television

Film

References

Living people
Indian television actresses
Indian film actresses
Year of birth missing (living people)